Osvaldo Darío Nartallo (born 1972 in General Belgrano, Buenos Aires, Argentina), is a former Argentine footballer.

Nartallo started his career with San Lorenzo de Almagro in 1990, he only made 10 appearances for the club, and left in 1992. His next club was Nueva Chicago in the Argentine 2nd Division.

Later in 1992 he joined Orlando Pirates in South Africa and in 1993 he joined Beşiktaş JK in Turkey, he achieved moderate success at the club, scoring several goals. He later played for in Petrol Ofisi Spor in Turkey.

In 1998, he moved to Spain and played for Granada CF, along with other compatriots, Gaston Lolito and Sebastian Hernán Cattáneo.

In 1999 Nartallo moved to Mexico where he played for three clubs, Puebla Fútbol Club (1999–2000), Toros Neza (2000) and Querétaro FC (2001).

In mid-2001 he wanted to seek new horizons, he nearly signed for a club in Chile but at the last moment the deal fell through. He then returned to Argentina to play for San Lorenzo de Mar del Plata, in the regional tournaments and in the local league, where he played alongside  Cristian Daguerre, Gaston Ervitti and Darius Cajaravilla. He retired in 2003.

External links
 Argentine Primera statistics
Profile at BDFA
Profile at TFF

1972 births
Living people
Sportspeople from Buenos Aires Province
Argentine footballers
Argentine expatriate footballers
Association football forwards
San Lorenzo de Almagro footballers
Nueva Chicago footballers
Beşiktaş J.K. footballers
Granada CF footballers
Club Puebla players
Querétaro F.C. footballers
Toros Neza footballers
Orlando Pirates F.C. players
Envigado F.C. players
Argentine Primera División players
Süper Lig players
Categoría Primera A players
Expatriate footballers in Colombia
Expatriate footballers in Mexico
Expatriate footballers in Spain
Expatriate footballers in Turkey
Expatriate soccer players in South Africa
Argentine expatriate sportspeople in Colombia
Argentine expatriate sportspeople in Mexico
Argentine expatriate sportspeople in Spain
Argentine expatriate sportspeople in South Africa
Argentine expatriate sportspeople in Turkey